Mark J. Cherry is the Dr. Patricia A. Hayes Professor in Applied Ethics at St. Edward's University, Austin, Texas. He is the author of Kidney for Sale by Owner: Human Organs, Transplantation, and the Market (2005), in which he argues that human body parts are commodities, and that the market is the most efficient and morally justified way to procure and allocate organs for transplant. His argument is based in part on what he calls the moral authority of persons over themselves.
Cherry is the editor of the Journal of Medicine and Philosophy, Christian Bioethics, editor-in-chief of the Health- Care Ethics Committee Forum, and series co-editor of the Annals of Bioethics.


Books
Kidney for Sale by Owner: Human Organs, Transplantation, and the Market. Georgetown University Press, 2005. , 9781589010406
Sex, Family, and the Culture Wars. Transaction Publishers, 2016.

Additional Information
Mark J. Cherry was a contestant on *"The Bachelorette"* in 2006 featuring Jennifer Schefft.

Notes

Bioethicists
American philosophy academics
Living people
Year of birth missing (living people)
Philosophy journalists
St. Edward's University faculty